Giacomo Andrea Bevilacqua (Rome, 22 June 1983) is an Italian cartoonist. He is the author of the comics A Panda Piace and one of the most popular modern cartoonist in his homeland.

On 22 May 2008 he creates the first strips of A Panda piace, his most successful work, initially published exclusively on the blog of the author and later collected in two volumes paper edited by BD Editions:  A Panda piace (2009) and  A Panda piace il bis  (2010).

In the same year, together with Lorenzo Bartoli and Gabriele Dell'Otto, known Roman illustrator, opens the "Sold out studio", an experience that will end two years later.

Parallel to the career of draftsman, Giacomo carries on that of actor and theatrical author for the company "Children Bad" by Marco Perrone; also works as storyboard er for film and advertising, designer of T-shirts and visualizers for advertising agencies. He collaborates with  Play the Lab , the creative workshop of Nokia.
In the same year he founded together with Francesco La Ferla, Stefano La Ferla and Stefano Benedikter, the division "Pandalikes Games", whose first fruit, a game for iPhone and iPad, will see the light between the end of 2010 and the beginning of 2011.

In 2015 he started working for the publishing house BAO Publishing, realizing his first graphic novel entitled The Sound of the World by Heart, a fully written 192-page story, designed and colored by the author, published in bookshops and comic books on 15 September 2016. It won the Feltrinelli readers' prize among the works nominated for Gran Guinigi 2017 at Lucca Comics and Games. Between May and September 2017, the graphic novel comes out in France (Manhattan murmures) and in the United States (The Sound of the World by Heart). Forbes placed it among the 10 best Graphic Novels released in the United States in 2017.

In 2017 he also started the collaboration with Sergio Bonelli Editore with two other stories entirely written, drawn and colored by the author. The first entitled Lavennder, released in July 2017 for the series Le Storie and then, again, in November of the same year in all the bookstores in the format' 'deluxe' ', the second, as a special volume of the Dylan Dog series dedicated to Groucho, released in the' 'Grouchomicon' 'collection.

References

1983 births
Living people
Artists from Rome
Italian comics writers
Italian cartoonists
Writers from Rome